Birthmark is an album by Danish jazz saxophonist Lotte Anker with two Portuguese members of the RED Trio, pianist Rodrigo Pinheiro and double bassist Hernani Faustino. Anker played at Lisbon in 2012 with Fred Frith and Ikue Mori, and Pinheiro invited her to play on this record session. The album was released on the Portuguese Clean Feed label.

Reception
In a review for All About Jazz, Mark Corroto states "Anker's command of her instruments (soprano, alto, and tenor saxophones) is exceptional. She has the full complement of sounds from overblowing to growls and at times, ineffable beauty."

Track listing
All compositions by Anker/Pinheiro/Faustino
 "Rise" – 8:45
 "Upper Bound" – 4:39
 "Daytime Song" – 7:54
 "Golden Spiral" – 13:59
 "Theorem" – 7:16
 "Dual" – 10:21
 "Voices" – 10:27

Personnel
Lotte Anker – soprano sax, alto sax, tenor sax,
Rodrigo Pinheiro – piano
Hernani Faustino - double bass

References

2013 albums
Lotte Anker albums
Clean Feed Records albums